Rise of the Footsoldier is a British crime and gangster film franchise written and directed by Julian Gilbey, Will Gilbey, Ricci Harnett, Zackary Adler, Andrew Loveday and Nick Nevern, distributed by Optimum Releasing. The franchise and its first two films are based on true events featured in the autobiography of Inter City Firm hooligan turned gangster Carlton Leach (Ricci Harnett) before later films focus on the lives of drug dealers Pat Tate (Craig Fairbrass) and Tony Tucker (Terry Stone) who were gunned down in the Rettendon murders in 1995.

The first film Rise of the Footsoldier released on 7 September 2007 and grossed £220,868, it was the third production from BAFTA Award-nominated director Julian Gilbey, it is based on the autobiography of Leach who had risen from a football hooligan to becoming a bouncer, hired muscle and later part of the Essex firm of the 1990s and his involvement with Pat Tate and Tony Tucker. The sequel Rise of the Footsoldier Part II: Reign of the General released in 2015 followed Leach in the aftermath of the murders, whilst Rise of the Footsoldier: The Pat Tate Story (2017), Rise of the Footsoldier: Marbella (2019), Rise of the Footsoldier Origins (2021) and Tate: Days of Blood (2022) are prequels to the original and do not feature Carlton Leach, but are loosely based upon the lives of Tucker and Tate.

Films

Rise of the Footsoldier
Rise of the Footsoldier follows the rise of Carlton Leach from a football hooligan to becoming a member of a notorious gang of criminals who rampaged their way through Essex in the late eighties and early nineties. It is three decades of his life following him from football hooliganism, to bouncer, his involvement in the criminal aspects of the early 'rave' scene and subsequently becoming a violent criminal.

 Ricci Harnett as Carlton Leach
 Craig Fairbrass as Pat Tate
 Roland Manookian as Craig Rolfe
 Terry Stone as Tony Tucker
 Coralie Rose as Denny
 Neil Maskell as Darren Nicholls
 Billy Murray as Mickey Steele
 Ian Virgo as Jimmy Gerenuk
 Kierston Wareing as Kate Carter
 Patrick Regis as Eddie
 Lara Belmont as Karen
 Emily Beecham as Kelly
 Frank Harper as Jack Whomes
 Jason Maza as Rob
 Mark Killeen as Terry
 Dave Legeno as Big John
 Dhaffer L'Abidine as Emre Baran
 Mitchell Lewis as Kemal Baran
 Eden Ford as Paul
 George Calil as Police Killer
 Jay Taylor as Chris Wightman
 Phillip Weddell as Young Carlton

Rise of the Footsoldier Part II: Reign of the General
Full-time crook Carlton Leach (Ricci Hartnett) finds himself in a world of paranoia as he tries to shake off the effects of the Rettendon murders, the real-life clash that left three drug dealers dead

 Ricci Harnett as Carlton Leach
 Coralie Rose as Denny
 Steven Berkoff as Dr. Flint
 Luke Mably as Shawn
 Jonathan Harden as Dave
 Slaine Kelly as Lucy
 Tygo Gernandt as Lars
 Nabil Elouahabi as Demirkan
 Big Narstie as Bob
 Daniel Adegboyega as Steve
 Peter Benedict as Geoff King
 Ryan Oliva as Kenny Davis
 Chris Brazier as Matthew Taylor
 Lockhart Ogilvie as Afanas
 Charlie Heaton as Dealer
 Craig Fairbrass as Pat Tate
 Terry Stone as Tony Tucker
 Roland Manookian as Craig Rolfe

Rise of the Footsoldier: The Pat Tate Story
Notorious gangster, Pat Tate, rises through the ranks of Essex's criminal underworld, and battles rival drug dealers, vicious prison inmates and gets double-crossed by drug lord Frank Harris.

 Craig Fairbrass as Pat Tate
 Terry Stone as Tony Tucker
 Roland Manookian as Craig Rolfe
 Billy Murray as Mickey Steele
 Josh Myers as Kenny
 Ian Virgo as Jimmy Gerenuk
 Jamie Foreman as Sam
 Dan Fredenburgh as Joss
 Marcello Walton as Luke
 Shaun Ryder as Mad Dog
 Andy Beckwith as Cokey
 Larry Lamb as Frank Harris
 Eddie Webber as Lewis
 Emily Wyatt as Charlotte 
 Brian Croucher as Prison Governor 
 Stephen Marcus as Jack Whomes
 Simon Cotton as Adrian
 Vicki Michelle as Susan Daley
 Paddy Doherty as Paddy (uncredited)

Rise of the Footsoldier: Marbella
Fresh out of prison, Pat Tate (Craig Fairbrass) steps right back into his Essex nightclub business. But although the money is good, he can't stop brooding about the man who had him put away. It's not long before he's off to Marbella to find Frank Harris and seek his revenge. But Harris is long dead and the middle man Terry Fisher offers Pat the biggest drug deal of his life. All Pat needs is for his pals Tony and Craig to deliver the cash from Essex to close the deal. But Craig being Craig, turns a simple plane trip to a massive road trip with a stolen VW van and its hippie German owner in tow. All Tony wants is to make it back in time to support his best friend Nigel Benn at the boxing match of his life. But when their cash gets stolen and Pat is threatened by a local firm, Pat comes up with an even more audacious plan and to get them back to England in time for Tony to walk Nigel Benn out to one of history's greatest fights.

 Craig Fairbrass as Pat Tate
 Terry Stone as Tony Tucker
 Roland Manookian as Craig Rolfe
 Josh Myers as Kenny
 Andrew Loveday as Terry Fisher
 Emily Wyatt as Charlotte
 Nick Nevern as Greener
 Conor Benn as Nigel Benn
 Byron Gibson as Ricky
 Franky Lankester as Frankie 
 Adam Saint as Sidney 
 Paul Riddell as Detective
 Nick Kingsnorth as Klaus
 Jim Rosenthal as Himself

Rise of the Footsoldier: Origins
Soldier Tony Tucker returns from the Falklands war, a bitter and angry man. He soon makes a name for himself in the Essex underworld with his security business and drug dealing, and after entering a partnership with gangster Bernard O'Mahoney, his life spirals out of control in a cycle of drugs and violence. Things get even worse when he meets notorious hard man Pat Tate and local drug dealer Craig Rolfe, culminating in the Rettendon Range Rover murders of 1995.

 Vinnie Jones as Bernard O'Mahoney
 Terry Stone as Tony Tucker
 Craig Fairbrass as Pat Tate
 Roland Manookian as Craig Rolfe
 George Russo as Joey Waller
 Josh Myers as Kenny
 Keith Allen as Dave Simms
 Bronson Webb as Kevin Whitaker 
 Michelle Collins as Mandy Williams 
 Conor Benn as Nigel Benn
 Katie Jarvis as Donna
 P.H. Moriarty as Ian Jervis 
 Rachel Warren as Lucy
 Kirsty J.Curtis as DCI Jones 
 Tom Padley as DS Monroe 
 David Darby as Police Sgt (extra)
 John Junior as ICF Football Hooligan 
 Sam Gittins as Jacko
 Colin Newell as Tommy Mac 
 Adam Saint as Sydney Hexell
 Billy Murray as Mickey Steele
 Eddie Webber as Lewis

Tate: Two Days of Blood

 Craig Fairbrass as Pat Tate
 Phil Davis as David Hexell
 Geoff Bell as Jonny Knight
 Emily Wyatt as Charlotte
 Jamie Foreman as Sam
 Stephen McCole as Fergus
 Josh Myers as Kenny
 Kirsty J.Curtis as DCI Jones 
 Anthony Skordi as Mo
 George Russo as Joey Waller
 Tomi May as Hendrick
 Christopher Sciueref as Aziz
 Tom Padley as DCI Monroe
 Rob Knighton as Michael
 ArrDee as Stevey

Reception
TimeOut Film Guide (2011 edition) reviewer David Jenkinson describes Rise of the Footsoldier as "a repugnant gangland romp in which ruffians get tooled up with axe handles, baseball bats and Stanley knives then knock ten bells out of each other for two hours." After a one-sentence overview, the review concludes that "Leach is then unceremoniously swept aside as the film hastily attempts to give the Rettendon murders a once-over in the scrappy second half."

In America, Videohound's Golden Movie Retriever also disliked it, throwing the film one bone (out of possible four) and dismissing it as "Brit crime flick, based on a true story, that has nothing going for it but violence". Indicating that "Carlton Leach goes from football hooligan in the 1980s to criminal muscle and gangster in the 1990s", the write-up ends with mention of "three murdered drug dealers who were found in rural Essex".

Series
A sequel, Rise of the Footsoldier Part II: Reign of the General, was released in December 2015. A prequel titled Rise of the Footsoldier: The Pat Tate Story was released in 2017. The fourth part is 2019's Rise of the Footsoldier: Marbella. A fifth installment, Rise of the Footsoldier: Origins, was released in 2021.

References

External links
 
 

2007 films
British crime films
British gangster films
British docudrama films
Films about drugs
Hood films
Hooliganism
Films directed by Julian Gilbey
Gateway Films films
2000s crime drama films
Film franchises introduced in 2007
2000s English-language films
2000s American films
2000s British films